Rex Harry (19 October 1936 – 15 April 2019) was an Australian cricketer. He played one first-class match for Victoria in 1962. A right-arm leg-spinner, he also played 122 matches for North Melbourne between 1956–57 and 1965–66, taking 239 wickets.

See also
 List of Victoria first-class cricketers

References

External links
 

1936 births
2019 deaths
Australian cricketers
Victoria cricketers
Cricketers from Melbourne